The 2006–07 FA Cup qualifying rounds opened the 126th season of competition in England for 'The Football Association Challenge Cup' (FA Cup), the world's oldest association football single knockout competition. A total of 687 clubs were accepted for the competition, up 13 from the previous season’s 674.

The large number of clubs entering the tournament from lower down (Levels 5 through 11) in the English football pyramid meant that the competition started with six rounds of preliminary (2) and qualifying (4) knockouts for these non-League teams. South Western Football League was the only level 11 league represented in the Cup, eleven clubs from the South Western Football League were the lowest-ranked clubs in competition. The 32 winning teams from Fourth qualifying round progressed to the First round proper, where League teams tiered at Levels 3 and 4 entered the competition.

Calendar

Extra preliminary round
Matches played on Friday/Saturday/Sunday 18 to 20 August 2006. 258 clubs from Level 9, Level 10 and Level 11 of English football, entered at this stage of the competition, while other 91 clubs from levels 9-11 get a bye to the preliminary round.

Preliminary round
Matches played on weekend of Saturday 2 September 2006. A total of 332 clubs took part in this stage of the competition, including the 129 winners from the Extra preliminary round, 91 clubs from Levels 9-11, who get a bye in the extra preliminary round and 112 entering at this stage from the five divisions at Level 8 of English football. The round featured seven clubs from Level 11 (all from the South Western Football League) still in the competition, being the lowest ranked clubs in this round.

First qualifying round
Matches on weekend of Saturday 16 September 2006. A total of 232 clubs took part in this stage of the competition, including the 166 winners from the Preliminary round and 66 entering at this stage from the top division of the three leagues at Level 7 of English football. The round featured four clubs from Level 11 (all from the South Western Football League) still in the competition, being the lowest ranked clubs in this round.

Second qualifying round
Matches played on weekend of Saturday 30 September 2006. A total of 160 clubs took part in this stage of the competition, including the 116 winners from the first qualifying round and 44 Level 6 clubs, from Conference North and Conference South, entering at this stage. St Blazey from Level 11 of English football were the lowest-ranked club to qualify for this round of the competition.

Third qualifying round
Matches played on weekend of Saturday 14 October 2006. A total of 80 clubs took part, all having progressed from the second qualifying round. Haverhill Rovers from Level 10 of English football were the lowest-ranked club to qualify for this round of the competition.

Fourth qualifying round
Matches played on weekend of Saturday 28 October 2006. A total of 64 clubs took part, 40 having progressed from the third qualifying round and 24 clubs from Conference Premier, forming Level 5 of English football, entering at this stage. Haverhill Rovers from Level 10 of English football were the lowest-ranked club to qualify for this round of the competition.

Competition proper
See 2006–07 FA Cup for details of the rounds from the first round proper onwards.

External links
 Football Club History Database: FA Cup 2006-07
 The FA Cup Archive

FA Cup qualifying rounds
Qual